Jimmy Hempte (born 24 March 1982 in Tournai) is a Belgium retired footballer who played as a left back and current head coach of CS PV Ostiches.

Club career
He joined R.E. Mouscron in 2004 from K.A.A. Gent.

In the summer of 2010 he left K.V. Kortrijk and signed with Roda JC Kerkrade. After three years he was released and he signed with KV Oostende.

Coaching and later career
In the summer 2015, Hempte joined RFC Tournai. On 14 October 2015, he was promoted to player-head coach at Tournai. He left the club in August 2016.

A few days after leaving Tournai, Hempte joined RE Acren-Lessines as a player, which he played for, for one season.

In the summer 2017, Hempte then joined F.C. Gullegem. In the summer 2018 the club announced, that Hempte had retired and would continue as a youth coach at Royal Excel Mouscron. However, in September, it was reported that he would continue to play for Gullegem alongside his coaching position at Mouscron.

In February 2020, he was appointed head coach of CS Pays Vert Ostiches Ath.

References

External links
 Jimmy Hempte at Footballdatabase

1982 births
Living people
Sportspeople from Tournai
Footballers from Hainaut (province)
Belgian footballers
Belgian expatriate footballers
Belgian Pro League players
Challenger Pro League players
Eredivisie players
K.A.A. Gent players
Royal Excel Mouscron players
K.V. Kortrijk players
Roda JC Kerkrade players
K.V. Oostende players
Belgian expatriate sportspeople in the Netherlands
Expatriate footballers in the Netherlands
Association football defenders
Belgian football managers